Reinecke is a surname. Notable people with the name include

 Carl Reinecke (1824–1910), German composer, pianist and conductor
 Edwin Reinecke (1924– 2016), former Lieutenant Governor of California
 Hans-Peter Reinecke, actor
 Hermann Reinecke (1888–1973), Nazi war criminal
 Jost Reinecke, sociologist
 Michael von Reinecke (1801–1859), Russian vice-admiral and hydrographer
 Paul Reinecke (1872–1958), German historian
 Zudie Harris Reinecke (1870–1924), American composer and pianist

See also
Reineke, a surname
 Reinecke's salt, a chemical compound

Surnames from given names